Smeg or SMEG may refer to:

 Smeg (appliances), an Italian company
 Smeg (vulgarism), a profanity in fictional TV sitcom Red Dwarf
 Smeg Virus Construction Kit, for computer viruses
 Shanghai Media & Entertainment Group, a media conglomerate in China
 SMEG (menu editor), Simple Menu Editor for GNOME
 Société Monégasque de l'Electricité et du Gaz, Monaco's supplier of electricity and gas